FC Myrhorod is a Ukrainian amateur football club from Myrhorod. Until 1997 it was known as FC Petrivtsi. It plays in the Poltava Oblast Championship (season 2018–19).

League and cup history

{|class="wikitable"
|-bgcolor="#efefef"
! Season
! Div.
! Pos.
! Pl.
! W
! D
! L
! GS
! GA
! P
!Domestic Cup
!colspan=2|Europe
!Notes
|}

References

Football clubs in Poltava Oblast
Myrhorod